The Rowing competition at the 2010 Central American and Caribbean Games was held in Mayagüez, Puerto Rico. 

The tournament was scheduled to be held from 25–28 July at the Lake Cerrillos in Ponce.

Medal summary

Men's events

Women's events

External links

Events at the 2010 Central American and Caribbean Games
July 2010 sports events in North America
2010 in rowing
2010